East Ballina, New South Wales is a locality of the town of Ballina, New South Wales and has three main beaches including Angels Beach, Shelly Beach and Lighthouse Beach. East Ballina also has the historic Lighthouse on Lighthouse Hill, which was built in 1879.

East Ballina was the original settlement of Ballina, now the Shaw's Bay Caravan Park and Pub.

References

Ballina Shire
Localities in New South Wales
Northern Rivers